The Hội Trí Tri or the Société d’Enseignement Mutuel du Tonkin (1892-1946) was an educational society in French colonial Tonkin. It was part of the modernist movement. The Association for Mutual Education was behind the short-lived Tonkin Free School (1907-1908) at 59 Hàng Đàn where Phạm Duy Tốn was one of the teachers. The chairman was Nguyễn Văn Tố.

References 

Vietnamese writers' organizations
Confucianism in Vietnam